The Senior Cup is the prominent knockout competition for the Peterborough & District Football Association (PDFA). According to the current rules of the competition, it is open to all clubs whose affiliation is with the PDFA and those affiliated to the Northamptonshire County Football Association that lie within 10 miles of Peterborough. The current holders are Peterborough ICA Sports who defeated Sawtry 1-0 at London Road Stadium in Peterborough.

History

The PDFA covers the town of Peterborough, Rutland, South Lincolnshire and parts of north west Cambridgeshire. For the purposes of the Senior Cup and other cup competitions, clubs affiliated to the Northamptonshire County Football Association that lie within 10 miles of Peterborough town centre are also included. The Senior Cup was first competed in the 1980-81 season.

Winners

Clubs shown in bold indicate their last win and the number in the brackets indicates the number of wins at that time.

Finals

References

County Cup competitions